Vladimir Ushakov (born 16 March 1982) is a Kazakhstani water polo player. At the 2012 Summer Olympics, he competed for the Kazakhstan men's national water polo team in the men's event. He is 6 ft 5 inches tall.

As of 2021 he is the head coach of Surrey water polo club in Surrey B.C. Additionally, Vladimir is head coach of Surrey Water Polo, a high performance club that has acquired numerous medals from national competitions across Canada.

References

External links
 
 

Kazakhstani male water polo players
1982 births
Living people
Olympic water polo players of Kazakhstan
Water polo players at the 2012 Summer Olympics
Ukrainian emigrants to Kazakhstan
Ukrainian people of Russian descent
Sportspeople from Mariupol
Asian Games medalists in water polo
Water polo players at the 2014 Asian Games
Asian Games gold medalists for Kazakhstan
Medalists at the 2014 Asian Games